Alan P. Boss (born in Lakewood, Ohio) is a United States astrophysicist and planetary scientist.

Life and career
Educated at the University of South Florida and the University of California, Santa Barbara, Boss is a prominent scientist in stellar and planetary system formation and the study of extrasolar planets who has made highly cited contributions to the study of gas giant planet and binary star system formation. He has published hundreds of articles in these areas and related fields. He is currently a Staff Member at the Carnegie Institution for Science in the Department of Terrestrial Magnetism. 
He was married to Catherine Ann Starkie and has two children.

Boss was selected to join the NASA Science Working Group for the Kepler Mission and the NASA External Independent Readiness Board for the Exoplanet Exploration Program, both charged with the detection and characterization of nearby habitable Earth-like planets. Boss is a fellow of numerous scientific academies and societies and regularly chairs working groups in his field.

Achievements
Boss received a NASA Group Achievement Award in 2008 for his role in the Astrobiology Roadmap.

Bibliography

External links
 
 
 Talk of Alan Boss at the Origins 2011 congress

Sources

1951 births
Living people
American astronomers
People from Lakewood, Ohio
University of South Florida alumni
University of California, Santa Barbara alumni
NASA people
Planetary scientists